Cafè del Teatre de l'Escorxador, or Cafè del Teatre for short, is a concert venue in Lleida (Catalonia, Spain) opened as an addition to the Teatre Municipal de l'Escorxador. Its address is Carrer de Roca Labrador 4 bis. Among its recurrent events are Cafècurt, monthly short-film screening sessions, some activities of the Lleida Latin-American Film Festival, jam sessions and other live shows, especially jazz-oriented music and rock.

See also
Culture in Lleida

External links
Official website

Culture in Lleida
Buildings and structures in Lleida
Theatres in Catalonia